Walter Duranty (25 May 1884 – 3 October 1957) was an American journalist who served as Moscow bureau chief of The New York Times for fourteen years (1922–1936) following the Bolshevik victory in the Russian Civil War (1917–1923).

In 1932, Duranty received a Pulitzer Prize for a series of reports about the Soviet Union, eleven of which were published in June 1931. He was later criticized for his subsequent denial of the widespread famine (1930–1933) in the USSR, most particularly the Holodomor. Beginning in 1990, there were calls for the Pulitzer board to revoke Duranty's prize. The Pulitzer Board declined to revoke the award and in 2003 said the articles which it examined in making the award did not contain "clear and convincing evidence of deliberate deception".

Early life and career
Duranty was born in a middle-class Merseyside family to Emmeline (née Hutchins) and William Steel Duranty. His grandparents had moved to Birkenhead, on the Wirral Peninsula in Cheshire, from the West Indies in 1842 and established a successful merchant business in which his father worked. He studied at Harrow, one of Britain's most prestigious public schools, but a sudden collapse in the family business led to a transfer to Bedford School. Nevertheless, he gained a scholarship to study at Emmanuel College, Cambridge, where he graduated with a first-class degree.

After completing his education, Duranty moved to Paris, where he met Aleister Crowley and participated in magic rituals with him. Duranty became involved in a relationship with Crowley's mistress, Jane Cheron, and eventually married her. 

In Magick Without Tears, Crowley terms Duranty "my old friend" and quotes from Duranty's book, I Write as I Please.

During World War I, Duranty worked as a reporter for The New York Times. A story Duranty filed about the Paris Peace Conference of 1919 gained him wider notice as a journalist. He moved to Riga, Latvia, to cover events in the newly independent Baltic states.

Career in Moscow
Duranty moved to the Soviet Union in 1921. On holiday in France in 1924, his left leg was injured in a train wreck. After an operation, the surgeon discovered gangrene and amputated the leg. Once he had recovered, Duranty returned to the Soviet Union.

During the New Economic Policy, which implemented a mixed economy, Duranty's articles failed to draw widespread attention. After the advent of the first five-year plan (1928–1933), which aimed to transform Soviet industry and agriculture, however, he was granted an exclusive interview with Joseph Stalin that greatly enhanced his reputation as a journalist. Duranty remained in Moscow for twelve years.

After settling in the United States in 1934, Duranty was placed on retainer with The New York Times, the terms of which required him to spend several months a year in Moscow. In this capacity, he reported on the show trials of Stalin's political opponents in 1936–1938.

Views on the Soviet Union
In the 1931 series of reports for which he received the 1932 Pulitzer Prize for Correspondence, Duranty argued that the Russian people were "Asiatic" in thought, valuing communal effort and requiring autocratic government. He claimed that they viewed individuality and private enterprise as alien concepts that led to social disruption and were just as unacceptable to them as tyranny and Communism were unacceptable to the Western world.

Failed attempts since the time of Peter the Great to apply Western ideals in Russia were a form of European colonialism, he wrote, that had been finally swept away by the 1917 Revolution. Vladimir Lenin and his New Economic Policy were both failures tainted by Western thought. Duranty believed that Stalin scrapped the New Economic Policy because he had no political competition. The famine in Ukraine demonstrated the lack of organized opposition to Stalin because his position was never truly threatened by the catastrophe. Stalin succeeded where Lenin had failed: he "re-established a dictator of the imperial idea and put himself in charge" through intimidation. "Stalin didn't look upon himself as a dictator, but as a 'guardian of a sacred flame' that he called Stalinism for lack of a better name."  Stalin's five-year plan was an attempt to effect a new way of life for the Russian people.

Duranty argued that the Soviet Union's mentality in 1931 greatly differed from the perception created by the ideas of Karl Marx; he viewed Stalinism as an integration of Marxism with Leninism. In one of his articles submitted for the Pulitzer Prize, Duranty opines on the Soviet actions that led to the famine.

Duranty sometimes claimed that individuals being sent to the labor camps in the Russian North, Siberia, or Kazakhstan were given a choice between rejoining Soviet society or becoming underprivileged outsiders. However, he admitted that for those who could not accept the system, "the final fate of such enemies is death". Though describing the system as cruel, he stated that he had "no brief for or against it, nor any purpose save to try to tell the truth". He argued that the brutal collectivization campaign was motivated by the "hope or promise of a subsequent raising up" of Asian-minded masses in the Soviet Union that only history could judge.

Duranty both admitted the Stalinist system's brutality and defended its necessity. He repeated Soviet views as his own opinion as if his 'observations' from Moscow had given him more profound insights into the country.

Duranty's motivations have been hotly debated, and his reporting is faulted for being too uncritical of the USSR, presenting Soviet propaganda as legitimate reporting.

In his praise of Joseph Stalin as an imperial, national, "authentically Russian" dictator to be compared to Ivan the Terrible, Duranty was expressing views similar to those of some White (Russian) émigrés during the same period, namely the Smenovekhovtsy movement, echoing still earlier hopes by the Eurasianism movement and the Mladorossi group currents in the 1920s. (Of course, Stalin was not Russian, but Georgian, with distant Ossetian ancestry – his paternal great-grandfather was an Ossetian—a fact that he downplayed during his lifetime.)

In 1933, Stalin rewarded this praise and appreciation by saying that Duranty tried "to tell the truth about our country".

Reporting the 1932–1933 famine
In The New York Times on 31 March 1933, Walter Duranty denounced reports of famine and, in particular, he attacked Gareth Jones, a Welsh journalist who had witnessed the starving in Ukraine and issued a widely published press release about their plight two days earlier in Berlin. (Jones' release was itself immediately preceded by three unsigned articles by Malcolm Muggeridge describing the famine in the Manchester Guardian.)

Under the title "Russians Hungry, But Not Starving", Duranty's article described the situation as follows:

In the middle of the diplomatic duel between Great Britain and the Soviet Union over the accused British engineers, there appears from a British source a big scare story in the American press about famine in the Soviet Union, with "thousands already dead and millions menaced by death from starvation".

The "diplomatic duel" was a reference to the arrest of engineers from the Metropolitan-Vickers company who were working in the USSR. Accused with Soviet citizens of "wrecking" (sabotaging) the plant they were building, they were the subjects of one in a series of show trials presided over by Andrey Vyshinsky during the First Five Year Plan.

Five months later (23 August 1933), in another New York Times article, Duranty wrote:

Any report of a famine in Russia is today an exaggeration or malignant propaganda. The food shortage, however, which has affected the whole population in the last year and particularly in the grain-producing provinces – the Ukraine, North Caucasus [i.e. Kuban Region], and the Lower Volga – has, however, caused heavy loss of life.

Duranty concluded, "it is conservative to suppose" that, in certain provinces with a total population of over 40 million, mortality had "at least trebled." The duel in the press over the famine stories did not damage the esteem of Duranty. The Nation then described his reporting as "the most enlightened, dispassionate dispatches from a great nation in the making which appeared in any newspaper in the world."

Following sensitive negotiations in November 1933 that resulted in the establishment of relations between the U.S. and the U.S.S.R., a dinner was given for Soviet Foreign Minister Maxim Litvinov in New York City's Waldorf-Astoria Hotel. Each of the attendees' names was read in turn, politely applauded by the guests, until Duranty's. Whereupon, Alexander Woollcott wrote, "the one really prolonged pandemonium was evoked ... Indeed, one quite got the impression that America, in a spasm of discernment, was recognizing both Russia and Walter Duranty."

Sally J. Taylor, author of the critical Duranty biography Stalin's Apologist, argues that his reporting from the USSR was a key factor in U.S. President Franklin D. Roosevelt's 1933 decision to grant official recognition to the Soviet Union.

Later career
In 1934, Duranty left Moscow and visited the White House in the company of Soviet officials, including Litvinov. He continued as a Special Correspondent for The New York Times until 1940.

He wrote several books on the Soviet Union after 1940. His name was on a list maintained by writer George Orwell of those Orwell considered to be unsuitable as possible writers for the British Foreign Office's Information Research Department, owing to the possibility of them being too sympathetic to communism or possibly paid communist agents.

Death
Duranty died in 1957 in Orlando, Florida, aged 73. He is interred at Greenwood Cemetery, Orlando.

Scholarship on Duranty's work

Duranty reported when opinions were strongly divided on the Soviet Union and its leadership.

The admission of the USSR to the League of Nations in 1934 was viewed optimistically by some. Others saw an inevitable confrontation between fascism and communism as requiring individuals to take one side or the other.

Many reporters of Duranty's time slanted their coverage in favor of the Soviet Union. Some drew a contrast with the capitalist world, going through the Great Depression; others wrote out of a genuine belief in Communism; some acted out of fear of being expelled from Moscow, which would result in a loss of livelihood. At home, many of their editors found it hard to believe a state would starve millions of its people deliberately. Duranty's reports for The New York Times were a source of much frustration for the paper's readers in 1932 because they directly contradicted the line taken on the paper's own editorial page.

The Ukrainian Famine (1932–1933) and the 1938 Moscow Show Trials
Duranty has been criticized for deferring to Stalin and the Soviet Union's official propaganda rather than reporting news, both when he was living in Moscow and later. For example, he later defended Stalin's Moscow Trials of 1938, which were staged to eliminate potential challengers to Stalin's authority.

The major controversy regarding his work remains his reporting on the great famine of 1930–33 that struck certain parts of the USSR after agriculture was forcibly and rapidly "collectivised". He published reports stating "there is no famine or actual starvation nor is there likely to be" and "any report of a famine in Russia is today an exaggeration or malignant propaganda". In Ukraine, the region most affected, this state-sponsored disaster is today known as the "Holodomor".

Since the late 1960s, Duranty's work has come increasingly under fire for failing to report the famine. Robert Conquest was critical of Duranty's reporting in The Great Terror (1968), The Harvest of Sorrow (1986) and, most recently, in Reflections on a Ravaged Century (1990). Joseph Alsop and Andrew Stuttaford spoke out against Duranty during the Pulitzer Prize controversy. "Lying was Duranty's stock in trade," commented Alsop. In his memoirs, British journalist Malcolm Muggeridge, then The Manchester Guardians correspondent in Moscow, talked of Duranty's "persistent lying" and elsewhere called him "the greatest liar I ever knew".

What Duranty knew and when
It was clear, meanwhile, from Duranty's comments to others that he was fully aware of the scale of the calamity. In 1934, he privately reported to the British embassy in Moscow that as many as 10 million people might have died, directly or indirectly, from famine in the Soviet Union in the previous year.

Both British intelligence and American engineer Zara Witkin, who worked in the USSR from 1932 to 1934, confirmed that Duranty knowingly misrepresented information about the nature and scale of the famine.

There are some indications that Duranty's deliberate misdirection concerning the famine resulted from duress. Conquest believed Duranty was being blackmailed over his sexual proclivities.

In his 1944 book, Duranty wrote in a chastened tone about his 1932–34 reporting, but he offered only a Stalinist defense. He admits that people starved, including not just "class enemies" but also loyal communists, but he says that Stalin was forced to order the requisitions to equip the Red Army enough to deter an imminent Japanese invasion (a reprise of the Siberian Intervention of a decade earlier)—in other words, to save the Soviet Union from impending military doom, not because Stalin wanted to collectivize the population at gunpoint, on pain of death. Although it is likely that Stalin did expect a Japanese invasion (expecting foreign attacks all the time), most historians today do not accept the view that it was his sole motivation.

Calls for revocation of Pulitzer Prize, 1990–2003

Controversy and concern over Duranty's reporting on the famine in Soviet Ukraine led to a move to posthumously and symbolically strip him of the Pulitzer Prize he received in 1932.

In response to Stalin's Apologist (1990), the critical biography by Sally J. Taylor, The New York Times assigned a member of its editorial board, Karl Meyer, to write a signed editorial about Duranty's work for the Times. In a scathing piece on 24 June 1990, Meyer wrote that Duranty's articles were "some of the worst reporting to appear in this newspaper." Duranty, Meyer said, had bet his career on Stalin's rise and "strove to preserve it by ignoring or excusing Stalin's crimes." The Pulitzer Board in 1990 reconsidered the prize but decided to preserve it as awarded. Four years earlier, in a review of Robert Conquest's The Harvest of Sorrow (1986), former Moscow bureau reporter Craig Whitney wrote that Duranty effectively ignored the famine until it was almost over.

In 2003, following an international campaign by the Ukrainian Canadian Civil Liberties Association, the Pulitzer Board began a renewed inquiry, and The New York Times hired Mark von Hagen, a professor of Russian history at Columbia University, to review Duranty's work as a whole. Von Hagen found Duranty's reports to be unbalanced and uncritical, which far too often gave voice to Stalinist propaganda. In comments to the press, he stated, "For the sake of The New York Times honor, they should take the prize away." The Times sent Von Hagen's report to the Pulitzer Board and left it to the Board to take whatever action they considered appropriate. 

In a letter accompanying the report, The New York Times publisher Arthur Ochs Sulzberger, Jr. called Duranty's work "slovenly" and said it "should have been recognized for what it was by his editors and by his Pulitzer judges seven decades ago."

Ultimately, Sig Gissler, administrator of the Pulitzer Prize board, declined to revoke the award. In a 21 November 2003 press release, he stated that, with regard to the 13 articles by Duranty from 1931  submitted for the award, "there was not clear and convincing evidence of deliberate deception, the relevant standard in this case."

The 2022 Russian invasion of Ukraine, part of the Russo-Ukrainian War, led to renewed attention on this decision. New York Times executive editor Bill Keller publicly expressed remorse that he did not do more to return the award in 2003, saying, "A Pulitzer Prize is not just an accolade for an isolated piece of work. It at least implies an accolade for the reporter's performance, and Duranty's performance was shameful."

Literary awards
(other than Pulitzer)
 O. Henry Awards, First Prize, 1928, for "The Parrot", Redbook, March 1928.

In popular culture 
Duranty is portrayed by Peter Sarsgaard in the film Mr. Jones (2019). The film depicts the story of journalist Gareth Jones as he seeks to find the truth about what was happening in Ukraine and then to have that story reported to the world in the face of opposition and denials from Stalin's Kremlin and Duranty.

Works

Books
(chronological)
 The Curious Lottery and Other Tales of Russian Justice. New York: Coward–McCann, 1929
 Red Economics. New York: Houghton Mifflin Company, 1932
 Duranty Reports Russia. New York: The Viking Press, 1934
 I Write As I Please. New York: Simon and Schuster, 1935
 Europe—War or Peace? World Affairs Pamphlets No. 7. New York: Foreign Policy Association and Boston: World Peace Foundation, 1935.
 Solomans Cat. Grand Rapids: Mayhew Press, 1937.
 One Life, One Kopeck – A Novel. New York: Simon and Schuster, 1937
 Babies Without Tails, Stories by Walter Duranty. New York: Modern Age Books, 1937
 The Kremlin and the People. New York: Reynal & Hitchcock, 1941
 USSR: The Story of Soviet Russia. New York: J.B. Lippincott Company, 1944
 Stalin & Co.: The Politburo, The Men Who Run Russia. New York: W. Sloane Associates, 1949

Periodicals
(contributor)
 "The Parrot", Redbook, March, 1928.
 ASIA Magazine, Volume XXXV, Number 11; November, 1935.
 ASIA Magazine, Volume XXXVI, Number 2; February, 1936.

Articles submitted for 1932 Pulitzer Prize
Eleven-part series in The New York Times:
 "Red Russia of Today Ruled by Stalinism, Not Communism" (14 June 1931)
 "Socialism First Aim in Soviet's Program; Trade Gains Second" (16 June 1931)
 "Stalinism Shelves World Revolt Idea; To Win Russia First" (18 June 1931)
 "Industrial Success Emboldens Soviet in New World Policy" (19 June 1931)
 "Trade Equilibrium is New Soviet Goal" (20 June 1931)
 "Soviet Fixes Opinion by Widest Control" (22 June 1931)
 "Soviet Censorship Hurts Russia Most" (23 June 1931)
 "Stalinism Smashes Foes in Marx's Name" (24 June 1931)
 "Red Army is Held No Menace to Peace" (25 June 1931)
 "Stalinism Solving Minorities Problem" (26 June 1931)
 "Stalinism's Mark is Party Discipline" (27 June 1931)

Two articles in The New York Times magazine:
 "The Russian Looks at the World" (29 March 1931)
 "Stalin's Russia Is An Echo of Iron Ivan's" (20 December 1931)

Translations
The Story of the Lafayette Escadrille, told by its Commander, Captain Georges Thenault. Translated by Walter Duranty. Boston: Small, Maynard & Company (1921).

See also
Gareth Jones (journalist)
Journalistic scandal
Lion Feuchtwanger
Louis Fischer
Malcolm Muggeridge
Soviet famine of 1932–33
Mission to Moscow

References

Sources
in chronological order
 Muggeridge, Malcolm (1934) – Winter in Moscow
 Conquest, Robert (1968) – The Great Terror: Stalin's Purge of the Thirties
 Crowl, James W. (1981) – Angels in Stalin's Paradise: Western Reporters in Soviet Russia, 1917–1937; A Case Study of Louis Fischer and Walter Duranty. Washington, D.C.: The University of America Press (1981), 
 Conquest, Robert (1986) – The Harvest of Sorrow: Soviet Collectivization and the Terror-Famine
 M. Carynnyk, B.S. Kordan and L.Y. Luciuk, eds. (1988) – The Foreign Office and the Famine: British Documents on the Great Famine of 1932–1933 in Soviet Ukraine. Limestone Press
 Taylor, Sally J. (1990) – Stalin's Apologist, Walter Duranty: The New York Times's Man in Moscow. New York; Oxford: Oxford University Press, 1990. 
 Luciuk, Lubomyr Y. (2004) – Not Worthy: Walter Duranty's Pulitzer Prize and the New York Times, Kashtan Press

External links

Defence of Stalin's purges
"The Moscow Trials"
 "Stalin's Apologist" by S.J.Taylor

Pulitzer Prize articles by Walter Duranty
"Red Russia of Today Ruled by Stalinism, Not Communism"
"Socialism First Aim in Soviet's Program; Trade Gains Second"
"Stalinism Shelves World Revolt Idea; To Win Russia First"
"Industrial Success Emboldens Soviet in New World Policy"
"Trade Equilibrium is New Soviet Goal"
"Soviet Fixes Opinion by Widest Control"
"Soviet Censorship Hurts Russia Most"
"Stalinism Smashes Foes in Marx's Name"
"Red Army is Held No Menace to Peace"
"Stalinism Solving Minorities Problem"
"Stalinism's Mark is Party Discipline"
"The Russian Looks at the World"
"Stalin's Russia Is An Echo of Iron Ivan's"

The Pulitzer Prize controversy
The section of articles regarding the campaign to revoke Walter Duranty's 1932 Pulitzer Prize
The Association of Ukrainians in Great Britain – Duranty Protest Site
The Ukrainian Canadian Civil Liberties Association (UCCLA) – W. Duranty Protest
Ukrainian Congress Committee of America official site about Walter Duranty and Holodomor
Zara Witkin's memoir of Soviet Russia, see pages 208–210
Pulitzer Prize Board Statement on Walter Duranty's 1932 Prize
Markian Pelech, "Critique of Sigvard Gissler's Statement on Walter Duranty's 1932 Pulitzer Prize"
New York Times Statement About 1932 Pulitzer Prize Awarded to Walter Duranty
Markian Pelech, "The New York Times Admits the Invalidation of Walter Duranty's 1932 Pulitzer Prize"
"Ukrainians want pro-Stalin writer stripped of Pulitzer", The Guardian, 4 May 2003.

1884 births
1957 deaths
Alumni of Emmanuel College, Cambridge
American amputees
British expatriates in the Soviet Union
British propagandists
Disinformation operations
English amputees
Fake news in the United States
Holodomor deniers
Journalistic scandals
Journalists from Liverpool
O. Henry Award winners
People educated at Bedford School
Pulitzer Prize for Correspondence winners
Soviet propagandists
The New York Times Pulitzer Prize winners
Writers about the Soviet Union